Anatole Collinet Makosso's government has governed the Republic of the Congo since 15 May 2021.

Ministers

References

See also 

 Cabinet of the Republic of the Congo

Government of the Republic of the Congo
Current governments
Cabinets established in 2021
2021 establishments in Africa
2020s in the Republic of the Congo